A contour canal is an artificially-dug navigable canal which closely follows the contour line of the land it traverses in order to avoid costly engineering works such as boring a tunnel through higher ground, building an embankment over lower ground, or constructing a canal lock (or series of locks) to change the level of the canal. Because of this, these canals are characterised by their meandering course.

In the United Kingdom, many of the canals built in the period from 1770 to 1800 were contour canals - for example, the Oxford Canal. Later canals tended to be much straighter and more direct - a good example is the Shropshire Union Canal engineered by Thomas Telford.

See also 
Canals of the United Kingdom
Lingqu Canal - the oldest contour canal in the world

Notes

References
Day, Lance and Ian McNeil. (1996). Biographical Dictionary of the History of Technology. New York: Routledge. .

Canals